Marc Johnson may refer to:

Marc Johnson (musician) (born 1953), American jazz musician
Marc Johnson (skateboarder) (born 1977), American professional skateboarder
Marc Johnson (rapper) (born 1979), Danish rapper known as Johnson
Marc Johnson (academic) (born 1948), American agricultural economist and academic administrator
Marc Johnson, cello player with Vermeer Quartet
Pierre-Marc Johnson (born 1946), Quebec politician

See also
Mark Johnson (disambiguation)
Marcus Johnson (disambiguation)